Route 29 Stone Arch Bridge is a historic stone arch bridge located near Middleville in Herkimer County, New York. It was constructed in 1870 and spans the south branch of Maltanner Creek, which empties into West Canada Creek.  It is situated on the north side of present New York State Route 29.  It is 35 feet long and has a single arch with a span of 20 feet and rise of 12 feet.

It was listed on the National Register of Historic Places in 2001.

References

Road bridges on the National Register of Historic Places in New York (state)
Bridges completed in 1870
Bridges in Herkimer County, New York
National Register of Historic Places in Herkimer County, New York
Stone arch bridges in the United States